is a Japanese former gymnast who competed in the 1992 Summer Olympics. He won a bronze medal in Barcelona as part of the Japanese men's gymnastic team. Chinen is a specialist in the pommel horse.

Chinen was born in Ishikawa, a former city that is now a district of Uruma, Okinawa Prefecture. He is the father of Yuri Chinen (born 1993), an actor, dancer, voice actor, talent, singer and member of the idol group Hey! Say! JUMP.

References

1967 births
Living people
Japanese male artistic gymnasts
Olympic gymnasts of Japan
Gymnasts at the 1992 Summer Olympics
Olympic bronze medalists for Japan
Olympic medalists in gymnastics
Asian Games medalists in gymnastics
Gymnasts at the 1994 Asian Games
Asian Games bronze medalists for Japan
Medalists at the 1994 Asian Games
Medalists at the 1992 Summer Olympics
20th-century Japanese people
21st-century Japanese people